Frank Ernest Gatliff (31 December 1927 – 23 June 1990) was an Australian actor based in Great Britain. He appeared in several films (notably as Bluejay in The Ipcress File) but mostly on TV, in such series as Gideon's Way, The Baron, Danger Man, The Avengers, Department S, Strange Report, The Persuaders!, Doctor Who (in the serial The Monster of Peladon), Rising Damp, The Good Life, The Onedin Line, Blake's 7, Minder and C.A.B..

Partial filmography
 On the Beach (1959) - Radio Officer (uncredited)
 Crooks Anonymous (1962) - Policeman in Park
 A Prize of Arms (1962) - Maj. Palmer
 Bitter Harvest (1963) - Police Surgeon (uncredited)
 The Ipcress File (1965) - Bluejay
 The Projected Man (1966) - Dr. Wilson
 Some Girls Do (1969) - Man Sitting Behind Pilot (uncredited)
 Hark at Barker (1969-1970) - Badger - the butler
 His Lordship Entertains (1972) - Badger - the butler
 The Zoo Robbery (1973) - Smythe
 Operation Daybreak (1975) - Surgeon
 The Four Feathers (1978) - Old Major
 The Prisoner of Zenda (1979) - Casino Servant (uncredited)
 The Bunker (1981)- Ernst-Günther Schenck
 Déjà Vu (1985) - William Tanner (1984)

References

External links 

1927 births
1990 deaths
Australian male film actors
Male actors from Melbourne
20th-century Australian male actors
Australian emigrants to England